A play clock, also called a delay-of-game timer, is a countdown clock intended to speed up the pace of the game in gridiron football. The offensive team must put the ball in play by either snapping the ball during a scrimmage down or kicking the ball during a free kick down before the time expires, or else they will be assessed a 5-yard delay of game (American football) or time count violation (Canadian football; that code's "delay of game" is a different infraction) penalty. If a visible clock is not available or not functioning, game officials on the field will use a stopwatch or other similar device to enforce the rule.

In all levels of Canadian football, the offensive team must run a play within 20 seconds of the referee whistling the play in; in amateur American football, teams have 25 seconds from the time the ball is declared ready for play. In the NFL, teams have 40 seconds timed from the end of the previous down. Before 2008, in college football, the play clock was 25 seconds after the ball was set, but the clock was not stopped for the ball to be set unless the previous play resulted in a stoppage of the clock. Now, the same intervals as the NFL are used, with minor differences for the final two minutes of each half. In 
high school football, starting with the 2019 season, teams will use the 40-second play clock as in the NCAA and NFL, with minor exceptions. Various professional leagues have used their own standards; the original XFL and Alliance of American Football, for instance, used a 35-second play clock to encourage faster play; the revived XFL uses a play clock measured 25 seconds from the spotting of the ball. Arena football used a 35-second play clock.

Also in the Canadian Football League, a time count is enforced differently at certain points of the game. If the time count occurs before the three-minute mark of a half, the penalty is five yards and the down is repeated. In the final three minutes, the penalty is a loss of down on first and second down or 10 yards, with the down repeated, on third down. If the referee deems a time count committed on third down in the last three minutes of a half to be deliberate, he also has the right to require the offensive team to put the ball in play legally within 20 seconds or else forfeit possession. (Time counts during convert attempts, during which the ball is live but the clock does not run, are 5-yard penalties with the down repeated at all times in the game.)

In the strategy of clock management, a team can slow the pace of a game by taking the maximum amount of time allotted between plays. A team wishing to do so would wait to snap the ball until there is one second left on the play clock.

In many football games, the play clock is managed by the back judge who is positioned behind the defense and faces the quarterback.  When the play clock counts down to 5 seconds remaining, some back judges will raise their arm over their head to warn the quarterback, and rotate their arm downward to their leg, counting down the final seconds.  A penalty flag for delay is thrown afterward.  The infraction typically results in a five-yard penalty.

See also
Pitch clock
Shot clock

References

American football terminology
Canadian football terminology
Time measurement systems